Donald W. Gant (October 24, 1942 – March 15, 1987) was an American singer, songwriter and record producer.

With Tupper Saussy, in the late 1960s he formed The Neon Philharmonic.  Singing vocals, with Saussy on the keyboards, they recorded five singles and two albums for Warner Bros. Records between 1969 and 1971.  The albums were The Moth Confesses (1969), containing the duo's biggest hit "Morning Girl" (peaked at #17 on 7–14 June 1969), and the eponymous The Neon Philharmonic (1969).

In Nashville, Tennessee he worked at Acuff-Rose Music as a songwriter and as an executive. He wrote a number of songs himself and co-wrote with Joe Melson. Songwriter Mickey Newbury said of Gant that there are "A lot of songwriters you'd never have heard of if it wasn't for Don Gant." Gant also produced records for singers Jimmy Buffett, Lefty Frizzell, Eddy Raven, Roy Orbison when he was with MGM Records and others and eventually joined ABC Records.

Don Gant died unexpectedly at the age of 44 in Nashville of complications following a serious boating accident in Florida.

References

1942 births
1987 deaths
American male songwriters
American record producers
American music industry executives
Accidental deaths in Florida
Boating accident deaths
20th-century American singers
20th-century American businesspeople
20th-century American male singers